The women's long jump event at the 2011 Summer Universiade was held on 16–17 August.

Medalists

Results

Qualification
Qualification: 6.25 m (Q) or at least 12 best (q) qualified for the final.

Final

References
Qualification Group A results
Qualification Group B results
Final results

Long
2011 in women's athletics
2011